Route 17, known along some sections as Point Pleasant Road, is a , two-lane, uncontrolled-access, secondary highway in eastern Prince Edward Island. Its southern terminus is at Route 4 in Murray River and its northern terminus is at Route 4 in Montague. The route is entirely in Kings County.

Route description 

The route begins at its southern terminus and heads northeast to North Murray Harbour, where it takes a right turn. It then goes north through Gaspereaux before heading northwest to its northern terminus.

Major intersections

Route 17A 

Route 17A, also known as Cambridge Road, is the suffixed route of Route 17. The route intersects Route 324 and Route 318.

References 

017
017